Beawar railway station is a railway station in Ajmer district, Rajasthan. Its code is BER. It serves Beawar city. The station consists of 3 platforms. Passenger, Express, and Superfast trains halt here.

Beawar is NSG-4 category station of Ajmer railway division of North Western Railway Zone.The Station is well connected to cities like Delhi, Mumbai, Bengaluru, Jaipur etc. Some Important trains which halt here are Ashram Express, Uttaranchal Express, Ranikhet Express, Yoga Express etc. 

It is a B Category Railway Station. It is the 3rd Largest Railway Station in Ajmer District  [4]  and among the top 20 stations in Rajasthan

Facilities 

The station offers the following amenities: Parking, ATM, foot overbridge, Coach indicator, Wifi, Dustbins, Booking windows, Waiting room and toilets.

Trains Halt Here 
Uttaranchal Weekly Express

Rajkot - Delhi Sarai Rohilla SF Express

Ashram Express

Ahmedabad - Shri Mata Vaishno Devi Katra Weekly Express

Ahmedabad - Varanasi Express

Ala Hazrat Express (via Bhildi)

Ala Hazrat Express (via Mahesana)

Ajmer - Dadar Western Express

Marwar - Ajmer Passenger

Delhi Sarai Rohilla - Porbandar SF Express

Porbandar - Muzaffarpur Motihari Express

Jodhpur - Indore Express

Ranikhet Express

Okha - Jaipur Weekly SF Express

Amrapur Aravali Express

KSR Bengaluru Garib Nawaz Express

Ajmer - Mysuru Express

Marwar Intercity Express

Ahmedabad - Lucknow Express

Ajmer - Puri SF Express

Yoga Express

Gwalior SF Express

Agra Cantt SF Express

References

Railway stations in Ajmer district
Ajmer railway division